In Concert is a Canadian music concert television series which aired on CBC Television in 1981.

Premise
Concerts were recorded during 1980 at Ontario Place's Forum in Toronto (a venue since replaced by the Molson Amphitheatre and Budweiser Stage). Artists featured included Judy Collins, Rita Coolidge, Chick Corea, Maynard Ferguson, Dizzy Gillespie, The Good Brothers, Dan Hill, Murray McLauchlan, Sérgio Mendes, Peter Tosh and The Travellers.

Scheduling
This half-hour series was broadcast at random times, often on a Wednesday, from 8 July to 16 September 1981.

References

External links
 

CBC Television original programming
1981 Canadian television series debuts
1981 Canadian television series endings
1980s Canadian music television series
1980s Canadian variety television series